C-Clamp was an American indie rock band from Urbana-Champaign, Illinois, United States.

Band history 
Sometimes referred to as slowcore, C-Clamp placed emphasis on mood, texture and rhythm.  Known for their dense layering and simple, yet beautiful vocal harmonies, C-Clamp released only two full-length albums in their career.  Although they performed live infrequently, they managed to share the stage with many noteworthy bands of that era, including Braid, Castor, Dianogah, Karate and Hum.

Nick Macri went on to perform in the bands Heroic Doses, Euphone, Sunny Day Real Estate, The Lonesome Organist, and The Zincs, as well as with the artists Bobby Conn and Jeremy Enigk.

Discography

C-Clamp Releases

Compilations

Cover The Earth (Mud Records, 1996)
Ground Rule Double (Divot/Actionboy Records, 1996)

References

External links
Ohio Gold Band Page
Myspace

Indie rock musical groups from Illinois
Musical groups from Chicago
Sadcore and slowcore groups